Quzluy-e Sofla (also Romanized as Qūzlūy-e Soflá; also known as Qowzlū-ye Pā’īn and Qowzlū-ye Soflá) is a village in Kani Bazar Rural District, Khalifan District, Mahabad County, West Azerbaijan Province, Iran. At the 2006 census, its population was 346, in 49 families.

References 

Populated places in Mahabad County